Elmor Tilley Kennedy (December 19, 1885 – July 15, 1953) was a physician, surgeon and political figure in the Province of New Brunswick, Canada. He represented King's County in the Legislative Assembly of New Brunswick from 1939 to 1953 as a Conservative and then Progressive Conservative member.

He was born in Youngs Cove, New Brunswick the son of William E. Kennedy and Mary A. Gale. Kennedy was educated at the University of New Brunswick and the Chicago Medical School. He served in the Canadian Expeditionary Force in World War I as a medical officer. In 1922, Kennedy married Marjorie Roach. He was mayor of Sussex. Kennedy was named speaker for the provincial assembly in 1953 but died in office later that year.

References 

 Canadian Parliamentary Guide, 1953, PG Normandin

1885 births
1953 deaths
20th-century Canadian politicians
20th-century Canadian physicians
Canadian surgeons
Progressive Conservative Party of New Brunswick MLAs
Speakers of the Legislative Assembly of New Brunswick
Mayors of places in New Brunswick
People from Queens County, New Brunswick
University of New Brunswick alumni
Rosalind Franklin University of Medicine and Science alumni
20th-century surgeons